Baquedano may refer to:

People
Manuel Baquedano, Chilean military man during the War of the Pacific and provisional chief of government after the 1891 civil war.
Fernando Baquedano, Chilean military man, father of Manuel Baquedano.

Places
Baquedano, Antofagasta, a village in Chile.
Baquedano metro station
Plaza Baquedano
Cordón Baquedano
Baquedano Street
Baquedano, Navarra, a town in Spain

Ships
 Chilean frigate General Baquedano (PF-09)
 Chilean corvette Baquedano (1898)